Graham is a census-designated place (CDP) located in Muhlenberg County, Kentucky, United States.

History
A post office was established in the community in 1904. Graham was named for William Graham Duncan, the Scottish-American owner of the W. G. Duncan Coal Company for which the coal town was built.

Geography
It is located at the junction of U.S. 62 and Kentucky Route 175. The town is also accessible from the Exit 48 interchange of the nearby Wendell H. Ford Western Kentucky Parkway, which passes through the general area.

Education 
Students from Graham attend institutions of the Muhlenberg County School system, including Muhlenberg County High School.

References

Unincorporated communities in Muhlenberg County, Kentucky
Unincorporated communities in Kentucky
Coal towns in Kentucky